David Norton may refer to:

Dave Norton (football) (born 1965), footballer
David C. Norton (born 1946), United States federal judge
David L. Norton (1930–1995), American philosopher
David P. Norton (born 1941), American business theorist and management consultant